The Russian Knights is an aerobatic demonstration team of the Russian Air Force. Originally formed on April 5, 1991 at the Kubinka Air Base as a team of six Sukhoi Su-27s, the team was the first to perform outside the Soviet Union in September 1991 when they toured the United Kingdom. On December 12, 1995, disaster struck as three team jets flew in-formation into a mountainside near Cam Ranh, Vietnam during approach while en route to home from a Malaysian airshow during adverse weather conditions. The team now performs with eight Su-30SM.

History

The team is based at Kubinka AFB. Kubinka is a major base of the Russian Air Force in the Moscow region.

Accident and incidents
On 12 December 1995, when approaching the Cam Ranh airfield (Vietnam) in adverse weather for refueling, two Su-27s and an Su-27UB of the Russian Knights team flew into a nearby mountain while in-formation, killing four pilots. The cause of the crash is attributed to a misinterpretation of approach-pattern instructions, and in particular the leading Il-76 that was acting as a reconnaissance aircraft.

On 16 August 2009, two Su-27s rehearsing acrobatic maneuvers collided near Moscow, killing one pilot and sending the jets crashing into nearby vacation homes. The dead pilot was identified as the Russian Knights' commander, Guards Colonel Igor Tkachenko, a decorated air force officer.

On 9 June 2016, a Su-27 pilot was killed near Moscow as he failed to eject when trying to avoid homes.

See also
 Soviet air shows
 MAKS Air Show
 Swifts

References

External links

 Russian Knights official website (Russian language)
 Russian Knights official website (English language)
 Russian aerobatic team Russian Knights on Aerobaticteams.net

Units and formations of the Russian Air Force
Units and formations of the Soviet Air Forces
Aerobatic teams
1991 establishments in the Soviet Union
Military units and formations established in 1991
Kubinka
Russian ceremonial units